Boniface Kiprotich Songok (born 25 December 1980) is a Kenyan middle-distance runner who specializes in the 3000 and 5000 metres.

His personal best over 3000 m of 7:30.62 minutes, achieved in 2004, was the third best time in the world that season, only behind Eliud Kipchoge and James Kwalia.

He is based at the PACE Sports Management training camp in Kaptagat.

International competitions

Personal bests
3000 metres - 7:30.62 min (2004)
5000 metres - 12:55.85 min (2005)

External links

Pace Sports Management

1980 births
Living people
Kenyan male long-distance runners
Kenyan male cross country runners